Claude Nicolas (born 21 September 1941) is a French middle-distance runner. He competed in the men's 1500 metres at the 1968 Summer Olympics. Nicolas is a former world record holder in the 4 × 1500 metres relay, with 14:49.0 minutes in June 1965. His teammates were Michel Jazy, Gérard Vervoort and Jean Wadoux.

References

1941 births
Living people
Athletes (track and field) at the 1968 Summer Olympics
French male middle-distance runners
Olympic athletes of France
Sportspeople from Doubs
World record setters in athletics (track and field)